(born September 23, 1982 in Saitama, Japan) is a professional motorcycle road racer.

He previously rode a Honda CBR1000RR in the MFJ All-Japan Road Race JSB1000 Championship. He was the 2006, 2007 and 2010 British Superbike champion and enjoys fame and popularity amongst British motorcycle race fans due to his success and personality. He raced for Honda Asia in 2012.

He  won the 2008 Suzuka 8-Hour race, teamed with his former WSBK teammate Carlos Checa.

Early years
Kiyonari first raced in 1988 in motocross, which he later stated that he did not especially enjoy. He began circuit racing in 1996, and first raced in the All-Japan 125cc Championship in 1998. He continued in this class until 1999 and spent the 2000 and 2001 season in the All-Japan 250cc Championship, with a shortage of big results, other than 9th place in the 2000 Suzuka 8 Hours race.

In 2002 Kiyonari switched to the All-Japan ST600 championship, which he won with four victories. He also took an All-Japan Superbike Championship victory at TI Aida.

MotoGP
Kiyonari moved to MotoGP in early 2003 on Fausto Gresini's Telefónica Movistar team.  There were eight minor points  finishes, leaving him 20th overall with a best of 11th.

By season

British Superbike Championship

After coming 6th overall in the British Superbike Championship in 2004, Kiyonari  won the first four races of 2005, before injuring his ankle in a heavy crash in round 5. He was back for round 9, and retook the championship lead from teammate Michael Rutter, but eventually was overhauled by the improving Ducati of Lavilla and he finished the season runner up. Kiyonari also raced in the Valencia Grand Prix for Sito Pons' Camel Honda team, finishing in the points.

In 2006, A double victory at Silverstone in the penultimate round kept Kiyonari in close contention for the title. However, in the double point final round at Brands Hatch, after a win in race one (he was leading when Shane Byrne's heavy crash caused a stoppage. Kiyonari only needed to finish third in the final race. Kiyonari finished 2nd in the shortened race behind Haslam, thus winning the championship by 8 points.

The 2007 season started at Brands Hatch, with Jonathan Rea and Leon Camier performing better on their Hondas. However, Kiyonari took a double win in round three, and a further win in race 2 at Oulton Park, to lie second to Lavilla after four rounds. Finally, Kiyonari defended his British champion at Brands Hatch to win the championship for the second time in succession.

Superbike World Championship
In  Kiyonari made his Superbike World Championship debut, having reached an agreement with Ten Kate Honda, to partner Carlos Checa and Kenan Sofuoğlu.

In the second race at Monza, Kiyonari nearly had his first SBK win. Kiyonari was in front as they braked for the final entry into the Parabolica but went wide on the exit and Noriyuki Haga and Max Neukirchner edged him out - Haga for the win and Neukirchner claiming second by a gap of just .009. Kiyonari finished third with a gap of .051, his first Superbike podium.

Kiyonari's first two wins came at Brands Hatch, beating Troy Bayliss in race 1 and Noriyuki Haga in race 2.  He briefly led the very next race at Donington Park, but fell on lap 2. However, he did win the second race in very wet conditions, visibly sliding the rear end of his bike on many occasions. Kiyonari broke his collarbone in a testing crash at Magny Cours, two weeks prior to the event, missing the race.

For 2009, Kiyonari stayed with the Ten Kate Honda team, partnering Carlos Checa and Jonathan Rea. His bike was backed by Honda Europe rather than Hannspree. He finished 11th in the championship standings.

Return to British Superbikes
In September 2009, Kiyonari returned to British Superbikes to make a wildcard appearance at Croft Circuit, replacing the injured Glen Richards. He finished fourth in race one before finishing race two in 18th position.

In December 2009, Kiyonari was confirmed as one of HM Plant Honda's riders for the 2010 British Superbike Championship season, partnering Australian rider Josh Brookes. At Cadwell Park he won race one but retired from race two before it began, due to a technical problem on the warm-up lap. He scored a double win at Mallory Park, lifting him to fourth overall in the standings.

2011 saw Kiyonari stay with HM Plant Honda in the British Superbike Championship, alongside two time BSB Champion Shane Byrne. He finished 6th overall.

FIM Asia Road Racing Championship
For the 2012 season, Kiyonari headed to Asia, leading Malaysian team Boon Siew Honda Malaysia Racing as they aspire to lift the FIM Asian SuperSports 600cc trophy. He went on to win the 2012 Asia Road Racing Championship title.

Return again to the British Superbike Championship
In 2013 Kiyonari returned to the BSB, racing with Samsung Honda. He finished 6th overall.

In December 2013, Speed of Japan announced that Kiyonari would be racing with Buildbase BMW in the BSB in 2014. .  Kiyonari's move to BMW was his first ever race with a manufacturer other than Honda, followed in 2016 by a switch to Suzuki.

FIM World Endurance Championship Suzuka 8 Hours
Kiyonari has four wins at the Suzuka 8 Hours, in 2005, 2008, 2010, 2012. He is the rider with most wins that is currently still active.

Career statistics
1998- 26th, All Japan Road Race GP125 Championship #90    Honda RS125R
1999- 23rd, All Japan Road Race GP125 Championship #26    Honda RS125R
2000- 20th, All Japan Road Race GP250 Championship #111    Honda RS250R
2001- 16th, All Japan Road Race GP250 Championship #100    Honda RS250R
2002- 1st, All Japan Road Race ST600 Championship #54    Honda CBR600RR
2003- 20th, MotoGP #23    Honda RC211V
2004- 6th, British Superbike Championship #23    Honda CBR1000RR
2005- 2nd, British Superbike Championship #6    Honda CBR1000RR
2006- 1st, British Superbike Championship #2    Honda CBR1000RR
2007- 1st, British Superbike Championship #1    Honda CBR1000RR
2008- 9th, Superbike World Championship #23    Honda CBR1000RR
2009- 11th, Superbike World Championship #9    Honda CBR1000RR
2010- 1st, British Superbike Championship #8    Honda CBR1000RR
2011- 6th, British Superbike Championship #1    Honda CBR1000RR
2012- 1st, Asia Road Race SS600 Championship #23    Honda CBR600RR
2013- 6th, British Superbike Championship #23    Honda CBR1000RR
2014- 2nd, British Superbike Championship #23    BMW S1000RR
2015- 20th, British Superbike Championship #23    BMW S1000RR
2016- 20th, British Superbike Championship #23    Suzuki GSX-R1000/BMW S1000RR
2017- 11th, All Japan Road Race JSB1000 Championship #88    Honda CBR1000RR
2018- All Japan Road Race JSB1000 Championship #23    Honda CBR1000RR

Supersport World Championship

Races by year

Grand Prix motorcycle racing

Races by year
(key)

Superbike World Championship

Races by year

References

External links

sportnetwork.net  Rider profile
Speed of Japan  Kiyonari's management agency

1982 births
Living people
Japanese motorcycle racers
Gresini Racing MotoGP riders
British Superbike Championship riders
Superbike World Championship riders
MotoGP World Championship riders